Christ Episcopal Church is a parish of the Episcopal Diocese of Bethlehem in Stroudsburg, Pennsylvania. It was founded in 1897 in a private residence in East Stroudsburg. The cornerstone for the current church building was laid on June 8, 1904, and the church was consecrated on November 21, 1905.

Notable parishioners 
Montgomery Fletcher Crowe, Pennsylvania State senator
Peter Roche de Coppens, Swiss sociologist and East Stroudsburg University professor
Kenneth Bernard Schade, founder of the Singing Boys of Pennsylvania

References

External links 
Official parish website
Episcopal Diocese of Bethlehem

1897 establishments in Pennsylvania
Christian organizations established in the 1890s
Churches in Monroe County, Pennsylvania
Episcopal Church in Pennsylvania
Religious organizations established in 1897